This is a list of international sports federations, each of which serves as a non-governmental governing body for a given sport and administers its sport at a world level, most often crafting rules, promoting the sport to prospective spectators and fans, developing prospective players, and organizing world or continental championships. Some international sports federations, such as World Aquatics and the International Skating Union, may oversee multiple activities referred to in common parlance as separate sports: World Aquatics, for example governs swimming, diving, synchronised swimming, and water polo as separate "disciplines" within the single "sport" of Aquatics.

International sports federations form an integral part of the Olympic and Paralympic movements. Each Olympic sport is represented by its respective international sports federation, which in turn helps administer the events in its respective sport during the Games. For a sport to become an Olympic sport, its international sports federation must be recognized by the International Olympic Committee.

Likewise, an international sports federation must be recognized by the International Paralympic Committee for its sport to become a paralympic sport, though in the latter case, several Paralympic Sports are governed by a dedicated committee of the International Paralympic Committee itself, under the World Para branding, for example track and field athletics for disabled athletes is governed by the IPC itself, under the name "World Para Athletics". Other Paralympic sports are governed within the structure of the able-bodied equivalent: for example, the UCI governs both able-bodied and paralympic cycling.

Federations recognized by the International Olympic Committee (IOC)

Association of Summer Olympic International Federations (ASOIF)
The following are the 28 members of the Association of Summer Olympic International Federations (ASOIF):

ASOIF associate members 
The following are the 4 current Associate Member International Federations of ASOIF (representing sports which are on the Olympic Programme of Paris 2024).

Association of International Olympic Winter Sports Federations (AIOWF)
The following are recognized by the Association of International Olympic Winter Sports Federations (AIOWF):

The following is an Associate Member International Federation of AIOWF (representing a sport which is on the Olympic Programme of  Milan-Cortina 2026).

Association of the IOC Recognised International Sports Federations (ARISF)
The following are recognised by the Association of the IOC Recognised International Sports Federations (ARISF):

Federations recognized by the International Paralympic Committee (IPC)
There are 17 international federations recognized by the IPC, while the IPC itself serves as the international federation for 6 sports. IPC recognises also 4 International Organisations of Sports for the Disabled. And there are another 14 federations which are recognised by the IPC but are not eligible to be IPC members.

Sports directly governed by IPC 
On 30 November 2016, the IPC adopted the "World Para" brand for all 10 of the sports that it directly governed at that time. At the 2021 IPC General Assembly, IPC members provided a strong mandate for the IPC to cease acting as the international federation for 10 sports by the end of 2026. Para alpine skiing, Para cross-country, Para snowboard and Para biathlon have been already transferred to FIS and IBU. Currently IPC acts as the international federation for 6 sports:

International Federations 
International Federations are independent sport federations recognised by the IPC as the sole representative of a  Paralympic Sport.

The IPC currently recognises 17 International Federations representing 19 parasports:

International Organisations of Sports for the Disabled 
International Organisations of Sports for the Disabled (IOSDs) are independent organisations recognised by the IPC as the sole representatives of a specific impairment group.
The IPC currently recognises 4 IOSDs:

IPC-recognised International sports federations non-eligible for membership 
The IPC recognises a number of international sports federations which are not eligible to be IPC members, but contribute to the development of sport opportunities for athletes associated with the Paralympic Movement and have organisational goals that are compatible with the Vision and Mission of the IPC.

The following 14 are IPC-recognised international sport federations:

Global Association of International Sports Federations (GAISF)
Federations whose sports are either included in the Olympic Games (ASOIF, AIOWF) or recognized by the IOC (ARISF) are also members of the Global Association of International Sports Federations (GAISF), formerly known as SportAccord. Other members of GAISF (non-IOC recognized) compose the Alliance of Independent Recognized Members of Sport (AIMS).

Alliance of Independent Recognized Members of Sport (AIMS)

Associate members of GAISF 
Other than full members (composing ASOIF, AIOWF, ARISF and AIMS), there are Associate members of GAISF.

Observers of GAISF 
The GAISF Observer Status can be requested by the Applicants to GAISF Membership interested to obtain support and guidance in their path to fulfil the GAISF Membership Criteria.

Other international sports federations

Miscellaneous
 International Game Fish Association (IGFA)
 International Gay Bowling Organization (IGBO)
 International Pitch and Putt Association (IPPA)

See also
 Association of International Olympic Winter Sports Federations (AIOWF)
 Association of IOC Recognised International Sports Federations (ARISF)
 Association of Summer Olympic International Federations (ASOIF)
 International Olympic Committee (IOC)
 International Paralympic Committee (IPC)
 International Beach Games Federation (IBGF)
 International Council of Traditional Sports and Games (ICTSG)
 World School Games Federation (WSGF)

Notes and references

Further reading 
 Cornelius, Steve; Cornelius, Danie. The Legal Status of International Sports Federations 2014 (1) Global Sports Law and Taxation Reports 6.

 *
Sports rules and regulations